Zef Pashko Shoshi (born 1939 in Tirana) is one of the most renowned Albanian painters. He studied  at the Art Academy in Moscow, Russia which influenced to a certain degree the style of his paintings. His talent and great technique was quickly recognized by the Albanian art circles, and caught the eye of the dictator Enver Hoxha who choose Zef Shoshi as his personal painter. A lot of government offices carried Shoshi's best works on their walls for a long time until the communists left and his work was sold illegally across Europe without him ever knowing or profiting from it.

During the 1970s, his painting adopted a more modern style, which almost got him in trouble with the regime at the time. Some of his best-regarded work is in art galleries across Albania and Europe and sometimes part of someone's private collection.

After the communism fell in Albania, the painter had a hard time finding himself in his country and in Europe. For couple of years he has worked in the neighboring countries like Italy and Greece and today he is still producing pieces of art in his studio in Tirana, Albania.

His work is part of the national and European art treasure.

References

External links
Piktori Zef Pashko Shoshi
Some of His Work - Click To View

Albanian painters
Living people
Year of birth missing (living people)